The Sweden national rugby sevens team is a minor national sevens side. Sweden won the 2017 Rugby Europe Sevens Trophy to qualify for the 2018 Grand Prix Sevens.

Sweden competed in the qualifying rounds of the 1993 Rugby World Cup Sevens in Catania, Sicily where they lost to Taiwan and failed to qualify.

See also
 Sweden national rugby union team
 Rugby union in Sweden

References

Rugby union in Sweden
National rugby sevens teams